Erikson is a common Scandinavian patronymic surname meaning "son of Erik", itself an Old Norse given name. There are other spelling variations of this surname, as it is common amongst Danes, Swedes, Finns, and Norwegians. Erikson is uncommon as a given name.  People with the surname include:

 Duke Erikson (born 1953), American musician with the band Garbage
 Erik Erikson (1902–1994), Jewish German (but a Danish citizen) developmental psychologist and psychoanalyst
 Jon Erikson (born 1955), American long distance swimmer
 Kai T. Erikson (born 1931), American sociologist
 Leif Erikson (c. 970 – c. 1020), Norse explorer, son of Erik the Red, and first european to reach the Americas
 Neil Erikson (born 1985), Australian extreme neo-Nazi activist
 Sheldon Erikson, American, Chairman of the Board, President, CEO of Cameron
 Steven Erikson (born 1959), pseudonym of Steve Rune Lundin, Canadian novelist
 Thorvald Erikson or Thorvald Eiriksson (died 1004), Greenlandic Norse explorer, son of Erik the Red, brother to Lief Erikson
 Tom Erikson, American mixed martial arts fighter

See also
Eriksen
Eriksson

References

Patronymic surnames
Surnames from given names